The Emirate of Granada, also known as the Nasrid Kingdom of Granada, was an Islamic realm in southern Iberian Peninsula during the Late Middle Ages. It was the last independent Muslim state in Western Europe.

Muslims had been present in the Iberian Peninsula, which they called Al-Andalus, since the early eighth century. At its greatest geographical extent, Muslim-controlled territory occupied most of the peninsula and part of present-day southern France. From the ninth to the tenth century, under the Caliphate of Córdoba, the region was one of the most prosperous and advanced in Europe. Conflict with the northern Christian kingdoms was recurrent, while mounting civil strife led to a fragmenting of Muslim states in the early 11th century. This marked a precipitous decline in the power of Iberian Muslim polities and facilitated the centuries-long Christian Reconquista and the recurrent conquest of southern Spain by North African dynasties, commencing with the Almoravids in the late 11th century.

By 1230, the Almohad Caliphate in Morocco ruled the remaining Muslim territories in southern Iberia. Exploiting the Almohad's dynastic strife, the ambitious Muhammad ibn al-Ahmar rose to power and established the Nasrid dynasty in control of a sizeable portion of this territory, roughly corresponding to the modern Spanish provinces of Granada, Almería, and Málaga. By 1250, the emirate was the last Muslim polity in the peninsula. Although effectively a vassal of the rising Crown of Castile, for over two centuries Granada enjoyed considerable cultural and economic prosperity. Much of the famed Alhambra palace complex was built during this period, and the Nasrids were the longest-lived Muslim dynasty in Iberia.

Nascent Christian power in Iberia meant that Granada's existence was always precarious. In 1491, after a decade of intermittent warfare known as the Granada War, the emirate was forced to capitulate to the Catholic Monarchs. The following year, Muhammad XII, the last Nasrid ruler of Granada, formally relinquished his sovereignty and surrendered his territories to Castile, eventually moving to North Africa in exile. This marked the end of independent Muslim rule in Iberia.

History

Formation and conflicts
With the Reconquista in full swing after the conquest of Córdoba in June 1236, Mohammed I ibn Nasr aligned Granada with Ferdinand III of Castile in 1246, thereby making it a tributary state, or taifa, under the Crown of Castile. Granada remained a tributary state for the next 250 years, with Nasrid emirs paying tribute to Castilian kings mostly in the form of gold from present-day Mali and Burkina Faso, brought to Iberia by the merchant routes in the Sahara. The Nasrids also provided military assistance to Castile for its other conquests.

In 1306, Granada conquered Ceuta, but lost control of the city in 1309 to the Kingdom of Fez which was assisted by the Crown of Aragon. Granada re-captured Ceuta a year later, but again lost it in 1314. Granada again held the city from 1315 to 1327. In 1384, Granada again re-took Ceuta but lost it finally to the Kingdom of Fez in 1386. Ceuta would be taken by the Portuguese Empire in 1415 and came into the Spanish Empire in 1580.

Granada's peace with Castile broke down on various occasions. Granada lost territory to Castile at the Battle of Teba in 1330. In 1340, Granada under Yusuf I, supported the failed Marinid invasion of the Iberian Peninsula, which ended at the Battle of Río Salado.

Granada also served as a refuge for Muslims fleeing during the Reconquista. Regardless of its comparative prosperity, intra-political strife was constant. Skirmishes along the border of Granada occurred frequently and the territory was gradually lost to Castile.

Fall of Granada 
The war of Granada would offer an opportunity for Ferdinand and Isabella to harness the restless Castilian nobility against a common enemy and instill subjects with a sense of loyalty to the crown. The Emirate's attack on the Castilian frontier town of Zahara in December 1481 led to a prolonged war. The Granada War began in 1482, with Christian forces capturing Alhama de Granada in February 1482. This marked the beginning of a grinding 10-year war. The Christian force was made up of troops provided by Castilian nobles, towns, and the Santa Hermandad, as well as Swiss mercenaries. The Catholic Church also encouraged other Christian countries to offer their troops and their finances to the war effort. Meanwhile, civil war erupted in Granada as a result of succession struggles in the Nasrid ruling house. Castile used this internal strife as an opportunity to push further into Granada. By 1491, the city of Granada itself lay under siege. On November 25, 1491, the Treaty of Granada was signed, setting out the conditions for surrender. On January 2, 1492, the last Muslim leader, Muhammad XII, known as Boabdil to the Spanish, gave up complete control of Granada to Ferdinand and Isabella, Los Reyes Católicos ("The Catholic Monarchs").

Aftermath 
The Christian ousting of Muslim rule on the Iberian Peninsula with the conquest of Granada did not extinguish the spirit of the Reconquista. Isabella urged Christians to pursue a conquest of Africa. About 200,000 Muslims are thought to have emigrated to North Africa after the fall of Granada. Initially, under the conditions of surrender, the Muslims who remained were guaranteed their property, laws, customs, and religion. This however, was not the case, causing the Muslims to rebel against their Christian rulers, culminating with an uprising in 1500. The rebellion was seen as a chance to formally end the treaty of Granada, and the rights of Muslims and Jews were withdrawn. Muslims in the area were given the choice of expulsion or conversion. In 1568–1571, the descendants of the converted Muslims revolted again, leading to their expulsion from the former Emirate to North Africa and Anatolia.

For Jews as well, a period of tolerance under Muslim rule in the Iberian Peninsula came to an end with their expulsion by the Christian monarchy in 1492.

Economy 

Granada's status as a tributary state and its favorable geographic location, with the Sierra Nevada as a natural barrier, helped to prolong Nasrid rule and allowed the Emirate to prosper as a regional entrepôt with the Maghreb and the rest of Africa. The city of Granada was one of the largest cities during this time: it accepted numerous Muslim refugees expelled from Christian controlled areas, doubling the size of the city and even becoming the largest city of Europe in 1450 in terms of population. During this time there were 137 mosques in the Medina of Granada. 

Granada was tightly integrated into Mediterranean trade networks and heavily financed by Genoese bankers aiming to gain control of the gold trade carried in through the Trans-Saharan trade routes. However, after Portugal opened direct trade routes to Sub-Saharan Africa by sea in the 15th century, Granada became less important as a regional commercial center. With the union of Castile and Aragon in 1469, these kingdoms set their sights on annexing Granada.

Culture

Literature 
Ibn al-Khatib was a polymath and poet of the Nasrid period. He authored many works in various fields, and his poetry is carved into the walls of the Alhambra palace.

Architecture 

The architecture of Nasrid Granada embraced extensive surface decoration in wood, stucco, and zillij tiling, as well as making use of elaborate muqarnas sculpting in many buildings. The Nasrids' most famous architectural legacy is the Alhambra, a hilltop palace district protected by heavy fortifications and containing some of the most famous and best-preserved palaces of western Islamic architecture, including what is known today as the Comares Palace and the Courtyard of the Lions. The palace complex was developed throughout the period but some of the most important contributions were generally made during the rule of Yusuf I and Muhammad V during the 14th century. The summer palace and gardens known as the Generalife were also created nearby, in a tradition reminiscent of the Almohad-era Agdal Gardens of Marrakesh and the Marinid Royal Gardens of Fes. Other notable buildings and structures known from this era are the Madrasa al-Yusufiyya (now known as the Palacio del Madraza), the Funduq al-Jadida (now known as the Corral del Carbón), parts of Granada's city walls, the Alcázar Genil, and the Cuarto Real de Santo Domingo in Granada, in addition to many various other fortifications and smaller monuments across the former emirate's territory.

Music 
Gharnati music is a variety of Andalusi music that originated in Granada and moved to North Africa where it survived to this day.

Military 

Constantly under threat by both the Christian kingdoms to the north and the Muslim Marinid Sultanate to the south, the population of the Emirate of Granada developed a "siege mentality". The country consequently maintained a strong military. Its border territories were dotted with castles maintained by frontier warriors (thagri) led by armoured elite warriors who were influenced by and comparable to the Christian knights. However, the core of the emirate's army consisted of highly mobile light cavalry as well as light infantry.

The Granadan army was ethnically and culturally mixed. A large part were recruited locally through the jund system in which families with military obligations were registered and conscripted for service. In addition, the Granadan rulers encouraged North African warriors to migrate to the country and serve as ghazi. These immigrants were mostly Zenata (or Zanata) Berbers and eventually organized as Volunteers of the Faith, a factually autonomous and very powerful unit within the Granadan military. The Zenata served as light cavalry, which gave rise to the Spanish term jinete (derived from the name 'Zenata'), which denoted this type of light cavalry. They formed the backbone of the Granadan army, serving both in crucial battles as well as in regular raids inside Christian territory. They were highly mobile on the field, armed with lances, javelins, and small round shields known for their flexibility, and used their own characteristic set of tactics. They sometimes also served as auxiliaries in Castilian armies, sent by the Nasrid emirs of Granada to aid their allies. They were recruited and led by exiled members of the Marinid family and settled within the kingdom of Granada. Their Marinid commander was known as the shaykh al-ghuzāt ('chief of the ghazis'), but in 1374 Muhammad V suppressed this office due to their political interference, after which they were commanded by a Nasrid or Andalusi general. 

Muhammad V reduced the status of the Volunteers and reformed the military, strengthening instead the Andalusian components of the Granadan military. The smallest part of the regular Granadan military were Christians and ex-Christians who had been hired by the emirs or defected to them. These were often Spanish knights and termed Mamluks; these warriors were organized as elite bodyguards by some emirs. To augment their army, the Granadans also hired foreign mercenaries.

In regard to its organization, the Granadan military was formally headed by the emir and divided into several units. The frontier areas were possibly commanded by rais, while each important frontier garrison was led by a shaykh khassa. The army was divided into major divisions, each led by a wali, under whom military emirs served as leaders for 5,000 troops, followed by qaid leading 1,000, naqib leading 200, and finally nazir leading eight. The Volunteers of the Faith were initially commanded by the shaykh al-ghuzat. In addition, there existed a Gendarmerie-like shurta in Granada city, commanded by the sahib al-shurta. The Granadan army was usually accompanied by a corps of guides (dalil), religious figures who tended to morale, armourers, medics, and some poets as well as orators.

List of the sultans of Granada

See also 
Nasrid dynasty
Romance of Abenamar
Taifa of Granada
List of Sunni Muslim dynasties
Border of Granada
Emirate of Córdoba

References

Works cited

Further reading 

Kennedy, Hugh (1996). Muslim Spain and Portugal: A Political History of al-Andalus. Longman.
O'Callaghan, Joseph F. The Last Crusade in the West: Castile and the Conquest of Granada. University of Pennsylvania Press.

External links 

Granada- The Last Refuge of Muslims in Spain by Salah Zaimeche
 Al-Ándalus III: el Sultanato De Granada (1232–1492) y Una Breve Reseña Sobre la Alhambra
 R.H. Shamsuddín Elía, Historia de Al-Andalus, Boletín N° 53 -08/2006 Al-Ándalus III: El Sultanato De Granada (1232–1492)
 Nicolás Homar Vives, Genealogy of the Nasrid Kingdom of Granada
 Genealogy of the muslim dynasties in Spain
  Les Nasrides, Les Banû al-Ahmar à Grenade

 
Granada
Former Muslim countries in Europe
Former Arab states
History of Andalusia
1238 establishments in Europe
1492 disestablishments in Europe
1492 disestablishments in Spain
Former countries